New Haven is a city in Franklin County, Missouri, United States. The population was 2,414 as of the 2020 census.

New Haven is within the Hermann AVA (American Viticultural Area).

History
New Haven was originally called Miller's Landing, and under the latter name was platted in 1855. A post office called New Haven has been in operation since 1858.

The AME Church of New Haven, New Haven Commercial Historic District, New Haven Residential Historic District, Wilhelm Pelster House-Barn, and Christopher and Johanna Twelker Farm are listed on the National Register of Historic Places.

One notable resident of the New Haven area was Herman Otten (b.1933, d. 2019), pastor of Trinity Lutheran for 55 years. He was the editor of Beck's American Translation and of the Christian News weekly paper.

Geography
The city is located in northwest Franklin County above the Missouri River Valley. Missouri Route 100 is on the south side of the city. Hermann is approximately 13 miles to the northwest and Washington is 11 miles to the east.

Demographics

2010 census
As of the census of 2010, there were 2,089 people, 818 households, and 533 families living in the city. The racial makeup of the city was 95.1% White, 0.7% African American, 0.6% Native American, 0.3% Asian, 1.7% from other races, and 1.6% from two or more races. Hispanic or Latino of any race were 2.1% of the population.

There were 818 households, of which 34.8% had children under the age of 18 living with them, 49.6% were married couples living together, 10.6% had a female householder with no husband present, 4.9% had a male householder with no wife present, and 34.8% were non-families. 30.9% of all households were made up of individuals, and 14% had someone living alone who was 65 years of age or older. The average household size was 2.45 and the average family size was 3.08.

The median age in the city was 36.5 years. 25.9% of residents were under the age of 18; 7.6% were between the ages of 18 and 24; 25.9% were from 25 to 44; 24% were from 45 to 64; and 16.7% were 65 years of age or older. The gender makeup of the city was 46.6% male and 53.4% female.

2000 census
As of the census of 2000, there were 1,867 people, 707 households, and 485 families living in the city. The 2010 population has risen to 2,008. The racial makeup of the city was 98.02% White, 0.64% African American, 0.27% Native American, and 1.07% from two or more races. Hispanic or Latino of any race were 0.86% of the population.

There were 707 households, out of which 35.4% had children under the age of 18 living with them, 56.0% were married couples living together, 8.9% had a female householder with no husband present, and 31.3% were non-families. 28.6% of all households were made up of individuals, and 13.9% had someone living alone who was 65 years of age or older. The average household size was 2.54 and the average family size was 3.13.

In the city, the population was spread out, with 27.3% under the age of 18, 8.0% from 18 to 24, 29.0% from 25 to 44, 18.6% from 45 to 64, and 17.0% who were 65 years of age or older. The median age was 35 years. For every 100 females, there were 86.1 males. For every 100 females age 18 and over, there were 80.7 males.

The median income for a household in the city was $36,681, and the median income for a family was $45,260. Males had a median income of $35,161 versus $21,108 for females. The per capita income for the city was $16,503. About 2.6% of families and 4.7% of the population were below the poverty line, including 2.4% of those under age 18 and 7.6% of those age 65 or over.

Education
New Haven School District operates one elementary school, one middle school and New Haven High School.

New Haven has a public library, a branch of the Scenic Regional Library system.

References

 New Haven History & Heritage, New Haven Area Chamber of Commerce.
 New Haven Community Profile, City of New Haven, Missouri.

External links
 Official New Haven City Government Website
 New Haven Chamber of Commerce Website
 Historic maps of New Haven in the Sanborn Maps of Missouri Collection at the University of Missouri

I

Cities in Franklin County, Missouri
Missouri Rhineland
Missouri populated places on the Missouri River
Populated places established in 1836
1836 establishments in Missouri
Cities in Missouri